The Battle of the Bay  between the Hampton Pirates and the Norfolk State State Spartans is a rivalry match-up in football between two HBCUs in the state of Virginia.

History
Private Hampton University and public Norfolk State University are both located in the Hampton Roads region of coastal Virginia. The two schools are located, respectively, in Hampton, Virginia and Norfolk, Virginia, across the James River from each other. As the name of the rivalry suggests, the James River empties into the Chesapeake Bay just downstream.

Hampton and Norfolk State were both members of the Mid-Eastern Athletic Conference in the FCS. On November 16, 2017, Hampton announced that they were becoming a member of the Big South Conference in 2018. The two teams are scheduled to meet again through 2024.

The football series began in 1963 and has been played a total of 57 times as of 2022.

Game results

See also  
 List of NCAA college football rivalry games

References

College football rivalries in the United States
Hampton Pirates football
Norfolk State Spartans football
1963 establishments in Virginia
Black college football classics
College sports in Virginia
Sports rivalries in Virginia